This article shows the rosters of all participating teams at the men's goalball tournament at the 2020 Summer Paralympics in Tokyo.

Group A











Group B











See also
Goalball at the 2020 Summer Paralympics – Women's team rosters

References

2
Men's team rosters